Nickel bis(stilbenedithiolate) or bis(dithiobenzil)nickel is a coordination complex with the formula Ni(S2C2Ph2)2 (where Ph = phenyl).  It exists as a black solid that gives green solutions in toluene due to a strong absorption at 855 nm.  The complex is a prototype of a large family of bis(dithiolene) complexes or the formula Ni(S2C2R2)2 (R = H, alkyl, aryl).  These complexes have attracted much attention as dyes.  They are of academic interest because the dithiolenes are noninnocent ligands.  The lengths of the C-S and C-C bonds in the backbone, respectively 1.71 and 1.39 Å, are intermediate between double and single bonds.

The complex was prepared originally by treating nickel sulfide with diphenylacetylene.  High yielding syntheses involve treating nickel salts with sulfided benzoin. The complex reacts with ligands to form monodithiolene complexes of the type Ni(S2C2Ph2)L2.

References

Coordination complexes
Chelating agents
Coordination chemistry